Bony Pierre (born 24 April 1991) is a Haitian footballer who plays as a striker. He played for Victory Sportif Club. He plays for Club Barcelona Atletico and the Haiti national football team.

Individual
2012 CFU Club Championship Top scorer - (7 goals)

External links
 
 

1991 births
Living people
Haitian footballers
Victory SC players
F.C. New York players
USL Championship players
Ligue Haïtienne players
Haiti international footballers
Haitian expatriate footballers
Expatriate soccer players in the United States
Haitian expatriate sportspeople in the United States
Haitian expatriate sportspeople in the Dominican Republic
Expatriate footballers in the Dominican Republic
Bauger FC players
Association football forwards
Liga Dominicana de Fútbol players